Justin Fojo (born December 7, 1988) is a Trinidadian footballer.

College and amateur
Fojo played College soccer at the College of Charleston.  In 2007, Fojo started all 15 games he played, recorded one assist and was named second-team all-conference.  In 2008, he made 21 appearances and scored his first goal on October 21 against Winthrop and was named to the Southern Conference Academic All-Conference Team.  Fojo made 21 appearances and scored another goal in 2009 and was named to the Southern Conference Academic All-Conference Team for the second year in a row.

While in college, Fojo also played for the Central Florida Kraze in the USL Premier Development League.

Professional
On April 11, 2011, Fojo signed his first professional contract with USL Pro club Orlando City.

Fojo joined the Puerto Rico Islanders for the 2012 season.

Honours

Orlando City
USL Pro (1): 2011

References

External links
 College of Charleston bio

1988 births
Living people
Trinidad and Tobago footballers
Trinidad and Tobago expatriate footballers
College of Charleston Cougars men's soccer players
Orlando City U-23 players
Orlando City SC (2010–2014) players
Puerto Rico Islanders players
Expatriate soccer players in the United States
Expatriate footballers in Puerto Rico
USL League Two players
USL Championship players
North American Soccer League players
Association football midfielders